Genevad is a locality situated in Laholm Municipality, Halland County, Sweden with 565 inhabitants in 2010.

References 

Populated places in Laholm Municipality